The Waiters' Ball is a 1916 American silent short comedy film directed by and starring Fatty Arbuckle. Arbuckle's nephew Al St. John has a memorable role as Roscoe's rival. The film is extant.

Plot

A cook and a waiter at a restaurant are both attracted to the pretty cashier.  She sees an ad for a waiters’ ball coming up that night.  Attendees must wear evening clothes; the waiter is distressed because he doesn’t have any.

The waiter tries to sweep litter from the restaurant into the kitchen at the same time as the cook tries to sweep it out; they fight, hitting each other rhythmically with brooms.  The waiter calls out customers’ orders to the kitchen using hash house lingo – e.g., two eggs on toast is “Adam and Eve on a raft.”  Meanwhile, the cook prepares the orders with much juggling and many sight gags.  For example, the cook gets a fish out of a cooler, but it’s still alive, and it leaps wildly; eventually, everyone in the restaurant becomes involved in subduing it.

The waiter sees the cook kiss the cashier, attacks him with a knife, and steals his dress suit.  The cook therefore puts on the fat female dishwasher’s evening gown instead.

At the ball, the cook enjoys a dance while the waiter enjoys a beer.  The cook then sees the waiter wearing his suit, chases him, and pulls the suit off him, leaving him in his striped underwear.  The dishwasher similarly pulls her dress off the cook.  The cook chases the waiter out to the street, where a police officer arrests them both and makes them don barrels.

Cast
 Roscoe 'Fatty' Arbuckle as The Cook
 Al St. John as The Waiter
 Corinne Parquet as The Cashier
 Joe Bordeaux as Her Brother
 Kate Price as The Dishwasher
 Alice Lake as A Fair Customer
 Jimmy Bryant as Restaurant customer
 George Marshall as Laundry Delivery Man

Influence
Arbuckle reused many elements of The Waiters' Ball in The Cook (1918), with Buster Keaton.

See also
 Fatty Arbuckle filmography

References

External links

1916 films
1916 short films
1916 comedy films
American silent short films
American black-and-white films
Silent American comedy films
Films directed by Roscoe Arbuckle
American comedy short films
1910s American films